Bob Lienhard (April 2, 1948 – September 22, 2018) was an American basketball player. Lienhard was selected in the 1970 NBA draft by the Phoenix Suns but never played in the NBA. Lienhard played professionally for Pallacanestro Cantù in Italy. He played college basketball for the Georgia Bulldogs.

College career

Lienhard became the Georgia’s all-time leading rebounder with 1,116 career rebounds. He also holds the single season record with 396 rebounds, as well as the single game record with 32 rebounds.

Professional career

Lienhard was drafted by the National Basketball Association's Phoenix Suns in the 1970 NBA draft (10th pick of the 4th round, 61st overall).

In 1970 he moved to Italy and played with Pallacanestro Cantu (1970–1978) with whom he won three Korać Cup, two European Cup Winner's Cup and one Intercontinental Cup.

References

1948 births
2018 deaths
American expatriate basketball people in Italy
American men's basketball players
Georgia Bulldogs basketball players
Pallacanestro Cantù players
Parade High School All-Americans (boys' basketball)
Phoenix Suns draft picks
Centers (basketball)